Isenoumi may refer to:

Isenoumi stable, a heya (or stable) of sumo wrestlers.
Isenoumi-oyakata, a sumo toshiyori name.
Kitakachidoki Hayato, head coach of Isenoumi stable and known as Isenoumi Oyakata